The 1881–82 international cricket season was from September 1881 to March 1882. The first match of the series was Test cricket's first ever draw. The fourth Test match became the last drawn Test in Australia until 1946-47 tour. Englishman George Ulyett's 149 in that match was the first Test hundred for England in Australia, and it was the highest score for England on the first day of a Test in Australia until Bob Barber scored 185 on the 1965–66 tour.

Season overview

January

England in Australia

References

International cricket competitions by season
1881 in cricket
1882 in cricket